Mary Clark may refer to:

Mary Clark (printer) (active 1677–1696), London printer and publisher
Mary Clark Thompson (1835–1923), philanthropist and wife of banker Frederick Ferris Thompson
Mary Kitson Clark (1905–2005), British archaeologist
Mary T. Clark (1913–2014), American historian of philosophy
Mary Higgins Clark (1927–2020), American author
Mary Elizabeth Clark (born 1938), main mover of the AIDS Education and Global Information System
Mary Clark-Glass (active since 1974), academic, medical administrator and former politician in Northern Ireland
Mary Jane Clark (born 1954), American author
Mary Ellen Clark (born 1962), American diver
Mary Clark (architect) (born 1936), Canadian architect
Mary Bateman Clark, American woman, born into slavery, who won her freedom

See also
Mary Clarke (disambiguation)